Wanderson Maciel Sousa Campos (born 7 October 1994), known as Wanderson, is a Brazilian professional footballer who plays for Internacional as a left winger.

Club career

Early career
Born in São Luís, Maranhão, Wanderson joined AFC Ajax's youth setup in 2002, aged eight, as his father was playing for the club. In 2009, again following the father, he joined Beerschot AC. After progressing through the latter's youth setup, he made his first team – and Pro League – debut on 31 October 2012, starting in a 1–3 away loss against Cercle Brugge.

Wanderson appeared in six league matches for Beerschot before it was relegated and subsequently declared bankrupt. On 20 June 2013 he signed a two-year deal with Lierse SK, after impressing on a trial.

Wanderson made his Lierse debut on 27 July, in a 1–2 home loss against Zulte-Waregem, and scored his first professional goal on 23 November, netting the first in a 4–2 win at Cercle Brugge. In October 2014 he was linked as a target to the likes of Celtic, Swansea City, West Ham United, Queens Park Rangers, Sunderland and Aston Villa, but none of them made any formal bids for the player.

Getafe
In 2015, after Lierse's relegation, Wanderson failed to appear in the club's pre-season; despite Lierse alleging he was under contract, his father alleged he was a free agent after receiving a FIFA clearance. He subsequently went on a trial at Getafe CF in July, signing a contract with the club.

Despite being assigned to the reserves in Segunda División B, Wanderson was called up for the pre-season with the main squad, also scoring a goal against Port Vale. He made his La Liga debut on 30 August 2015, coming on as a second-half substitute for Emi Buendía in a 1–2 home loss against Granada CF.

Red Bull Salzburg

On 1 July 2016, Wanderson signed a three-year deal with FC Red Bull Salzburg on a free transfer. He scored his first goal on 3 August 2016 in the match against Partizani Tirana in the UEFA Champions League.

On 19 December 2016, Red Bull Salzburg announced that Wanderson had retroactively been handed a four-month suspension by FIFA, that would end on 27 February 2017, due to a breach of the transfer terms during his move from Belgian club Lierse to Getafe in the summer of 2015.

Krasnodar

On 26 June 2017, Wanderson signed a five-year contract with the Russian Premier League club FC Krasnodar. On 3 March 2022, following the Russian invasion of Ukraine, Krasnodar announced that his contract is suspended and he will not train with the team, but the contract is not terminated and remains valid.

Internacional
On 11 March 2022, Wanderson joined Internacional on loan until the end of 2022, with an option to buy. On 21 December 2022, FC Krasnodar announced that Internacional activated their option to buy, making the move permanent.

Personal life
Wanderson is the son of former footballer Wamberto, who notably represented Standard Liège and Ajax. His older brother Danilo is also a midfielder, and was also an Ajax youth graduate. He also holds Belgian nationality.

Career statistics

Club

Notes

Honours
Red Bull Salzburg
Austrian Bundesliga: 2016–17
Austrian Cup: 2016–17

References

External links

Voetbal International profile 
Sport.be profile 

1994 births
Living people
People from São Luís, Maranhão
Brazilian footballers
Belgian footballers
Belgian people of Brazilian descent
Association football wingers
Belgian Pro League players
Beerschot A.C. players
Lierse S.K. players
La Liga players
Segunda División B players
Russian Premier League players
Getafe CF B players
Getafe CF footballers
Austrian Football Bundesliga players
FC Red Bull Salzburg players
FC Krasnodar players
Sport Club Internacional players
Belgian expatriate footballers
Brazilian expatriate footballers
Belgian expatriate sportspeople in Spain
Belgian expatriate sportspeople in Austria
Brazilian expatriate sportspeople in Spain
Brazilian expatriate sportspeople in Austria
Expatriate footballers in Spain
Expatriate footballers in Austria
Expatriate footballers in Russia
Sportspeople from Maranhão